Barry R. Komisaruk (born 1941) is an American psychologist and Distinguished Professor of Psychology at Rutgers University.
He is known for his works on sexology and sex therapy.

Books
The Orgasm Answer Guide (2009) with Beverly Whipple, Sara Nasserzadeh and Carlos Beyer-Flores
The Science of Orgasm (2006) with Beverly Whipple and Carlos Beyer-Flores

References

External links
An Interview with Barry Komisaruk

1941 births
Living people
21st-century American psychologists
American sexologists
20th-century American psychologists